Speak is a 2004 American independent coming-of-age teen drama film based on the award-winning 1999 novel of the same name by Laurie Halse Anderson. It stars Kristen Stewart as Melinda Sordino, a high school freshman who practically stops talking after a senior student rapes her. The film’s story is told through Melinda's perspective. It was broadcast on Showtime and Lifetime in 2005 after premiering at the Sundance Film Festival in 2004.

Plot

Fourteen-year-old Melinda Sordino begins her first year in high school and struggles on the first day. She doesn't have any friends to hang out with, and appears awkward and uncomfortable when speaking to others. Throughout the day, she is made fun of by several students, repeatedly called a "squealer". A series of flashbacks reveal that she called the police to a house party during the previous summer. Her reason for calling 9-1-1 was to tell the police that she had been raped by a senior student at the party, Andy Evans, but her trauma prevented her from reporting the rape over the telephone or to the police when they arrived.

When her parents see her report card, they prompt Melinda to see a teacher named Mr. Neck, who tells her to write an essay on any history topic. After refusing to read her paper aloud to her class, she is sent to the principal's office. Melinda is nice to a new student named Heather Billings, who claims to be Melinda's "friend", but Heather soon abandons Melinda when the chance for social advancement arises. The only other student with whom Melinda has a positive experience is her lab partner, Dave Petrakis, who has successfully managed to avoid affiliating himself with a clique.

The restoration of Melinda's confidence progresses at a painfully slow rate, with some help from Dave and her art teacher, Mr. Freeman. Her former best friend, Rachel Bruin, starts dating Andy, and Melinda fears that Rachel will suffer the same fate as she did. Melinda meets Rachel at the library and tells her the truth about what happened at the party by writing it on paper. Rachel first refuses to believe, thinking that Melinda is lying out of jealousy and calls her "sick", but comes to realize the truth by confronting Andy who had spoken Melinda's name earlier (despite claiming to have never met any of Rachel's friends before). Rachel then avoids Andy out of anger for his lies and for fear of getting raped by him, telling other people of what happened at the party all the while.

Exposed as a rapist and a liar, Andy retaliates against Melinda, cornering her; he tries to force her to tell everybody at school that the incident is false and attempts to rape her again. Melinda struggles and throws a bottle of turpentine at his face, blinding him, and overpowers him after holding a shard of glass from a broken mirror to his neck, threatening to kill him. They are found by Melinda's distanced friend Nicole who, along with other girls from her field hockey team, help Melinda trap a now-helpless Andy to prevent further attack. The altercation removes any doubt about what happened at the house party, and the girls who restrain him are outraged by it and tempted to beat him with their sticks out of spite. Mr. Neck sees Melinda walking away from the scene and asks what was going on, but Melinda doesn't respond.

On the way back from the hospital after being treated for her injuries, Melinda rolls down the car window and breathes in deeply. She finally finds the strength to tell her mother, who already suspects something awful, the truth about what happened at the party.

Cast

Production
Producer and screenwriter Annie Young Frisbie read the novel and successfully made a bid to get the rights to a film version. Production took place in Columbus, Ohio because a production partner, Matthew Myers, was relocating there with his wife.

Film production took 21 days in August 2003, on a budget of $1 million dollars. Flooding during an especially heavy summer rain caused filming to be temporarily postponed and during that time author Laurie Halse Anderson visited the set with her daughter. Anderson cameos in the film as the lunch lady who gives Melinda the mashed potatoes.

The school scenes for the movie were shot at Eastmoor Academy on the east side of Columbus.

Release 
The film premiered at the 2004 Sundance Film Festival and played the film festival circuit, including the Woodstock Film Festival. It later aired simultaneously on the cable networks Showtime and Lifetime on September 5, 2005.

Reception 
On Rotten Tomatoes, the film has an 80% "fresh" score based on 5 reviews. 

Marilyn Moss of The Hollywood Reporter gave an overwhelmingly positive write-up, describing the film as, "well-made and extremely touching." She praised Stewart's performance, saying she gave an "understated performance that will touch everyone who sees [the film]." Moss also praised the score and editing, saying it "merges [Stewart's] character's interior and exterior worlds beautifully." On his YouTube channel, critic Chris Stuckmann gave the film a retrospective positive review, praising Stewart and Zahn's performances, the cinematography, and direction. Stuckmann also said the film feels "at home" for him, because of the filming that took place in Ohio (Stuckmann's home state). Barbara Shulgasser-Parker of Common Sense Media gave the film a rating of four out of five stars, and called it, "a startlingly good film on what has become a familiar subject in both fiction and life." She praised Stewart's performance and the direction. Although Neil Genzlinger of The New York Times opined the film "comes nowhere near capturing the wise, subtle tone of the book it's based on", "[it] is still an effective treatment of a difficult subject, thanks almost entirely to the performance of Kristen Stewart as the young victim."

Christopher Null of ContactMusic.com gave the film a rating of three out of five stars, saying it "is decent, even pretty good at times, but ultimately this material feels so familiar that we see every turn in the story telegraphed from miles away." Dennis Harvey of Variety called the production values "OK," but said, "Eventual coming-to-terms (plus the culprit’s public humiliation) would’ve been much more potent with less caricatured adult characters and more nuanced direction."

Accolades 
In 2006, the film was nominated for a Writers Guild Award. Jessica Sharzer was also nominated for a Directors Guild Award in the category of Outstanding Directorial Achievement in Children’s Programs.

References

Bibliography

External links

2004 television films
2004 films
2004 independent films
2000s teen drama films
2000s high school films
American teen drama films
2004 directorial debut films
Films based on American novels
Films about rape
Lifetime (TV network) films
Films set in Columbus, Ohio
Films shot in Ohio
American coming-of-age drama films
American high school films
Films about post-traumatic stress disorder
Films about bullying
Films about violence against women
2004 drama films
2000s coming-of-age drama films
2000s English-language films
2000s American films